The IMI Galil is a family of Israeli small arms. Galil may also refer to:

 Galilee (transliteration HaGalil, i.e. "the Galil"), the region in Israel from which the name was adapted to other uses
 Galil (administrative unit), a Jewish administrative unit in Polish-Lithuanian Commonwealth
 Gershon Galil, Professor of Biblical Studies and Ancient History at the University of Haifa, Israel
 Yisrael Galil (1923-1995), inventor of the Galil assault rifle
 Zvi Galil (born 1947), Israeli computer scientist, mathematician, and President of Tel Aviv University
 Galil Ben Shanan (born 1982), Israeli football goalkeeper
 Galil Jewish–Arab School, the first joint Arab-Jewish primary school in Israel
 Camp Galil, a summer camp for Jewish students, located in Pennsylvania, United States